Roadworks (called road work or road construction in the United States) occur when part of the road, or in rare cases, the entire road, has to be occupied for work relating to the road, most often in the case of road surface repairs. In the United States road work could also mean any work conducted in close proximity of travel way (thoroughfare) such as utility work or work on power lines (i.e. telephone poles). The general term of road work is known as work zone.

Roadworks can, however, also happen when a major accident occurs and road debris from the crash needs to be cleared.
Roadworks are often signposted, although it is possible that the signage comes too late or too sudden or is missing.
Typical road work traffic controls are temporary signs, traffic cones, barrier boards and t-top bollards as well as other forms of warning devices. There are standards of temporary traffic control (maintenance of traffic) established in each country for various type of road work.

Roadworks are frequently carried out throughout the night so as to minimize traffic disruption.

Currently there are very few sources of accurate roadworks information sites available that report on the status of current works and future works.  In the UK the Roadworks.org website, an initiative run by ELGIN, aims to provide a national and live dataset of roadworks for the purpose of coordination and reporting. It includes roadworks information supplied by Local Authorities and national agencies like the Highways Agency.

Signage 
Typically, roadworks signs are indicated by an orange diamond in most MUTCD-influenced countries.

The 1948 edition of the Manual of Uniform Traffic Control Devices specified the legend MEN WORKING to indicate roadworks. For most European countries, the roadworks sign includes a red-bordered triangular sign with a symbol of roadworks.

Nowadays, the Federal Highway Administration and the Vienna Convention on Road Signs and Signals prohibit the use of the "MEN WORKING" legend, replacing with the legend "ROAD WORK" and the symbolic roadworks sign (typically using a gender-neutral silhouette) respectively.

The worded legend of the warning sign upcoming roadworks, which is banned by the 1968 Vienna Convention on Road Signs and Signals because UN-compliant signs must make use of more pictograms, is allowed in the United States by the 2009 MUTCD.

Lane markings 
In some countries, where lanes must be altered so as to accommodate roadworks, the new lanes (or interim lanes) are marked with a different colour and take precedence over the previous lanes. In Germany, Poland and many other European countries, it is yellow; in Switzerland and in Ireland, it is orange.

References

See also
 Road traffic control
 Roadblock
 Smart work zone
 Maintenance of traffic

 
Road infrastructure
Road transport